The interface between lanthanum aluminate (LaAlO3) and strontium titanate (SrTiO3) is a notable materials interface because it exhibits properties not found in its constituent materials. Individually, LaAlO3 and SrTiO3 are non-magnetic insulators, yet LaAlO3/SrTiO3 interfaces can exhibit electrical metallic conductivity, superconductivity, ferromagnetism, large negative in-plane magnetoresistance, and giant persistent photoconductivity. The study of how these properties emerge at the LaAlO3/SrTiO3 interface is a growing area of research in condensed matter physics.

Emergent properties

Conductivity 

Under the right conditions, the LaAlO3/SrTiO3 interface is electrically conductive, like a metal. The angular dependence of Shubnikov–de Haas oscillations indicates that the conductivity is two-dimensional,  leading many researchers to refer to it as a two-dimensional electron gas (2DEG). Two-dimensional does not mean that the conductivity has zero thickness, but rather that the electrons are confined to only move in two directions. It is also sometimes called a two-dimensional electron liquid (2DEL) to emphasize the importance of inter-electron interactions.

Conditions necessary for conductivity 

Not all LaAlO3/SrTiO3 interfaces are conductive. Typically, conductivity is achieved only when:

The LaAlO3/SrTiO3 interface is along the 001,110 and 111 crystallographic direction
The LaAlO3 and SrTiO3 are crystalline and epitaxial
The SrTiO3 side of the interface is TiO2-terminated (causing the LaAlO3 side of the interface to be LaO-terminated)
The LaAlO3 layer is at least 4 unit cells thick
Conductivity can also be achieved when the SrTiO3 is doped with oxygen vacancies; however, in that case, the interface is technically LaAlO3/SrTiO3−x instead of LaAlO3/SrTiO3.

Hypotheses for conductivity 

The source of conductivity at the LaAlO3/SrTiO3 interface has been debated for years. SrTiO3 is a wide-band gap semiconductor that can be doped n-type in a variety of ways. Clarifying the mechanism behind the conductivity is a major goal of current research. Four leading hypotheses are:

Polar gating
Oxygen vacancies
Intermixing
Structural distortions

Polar gating 

Polar gating was the first mechanism used to explain the conductivity at LaAlO3/SrTiO3 interfaces. It postulates that the LaAlO3, which is polar in the 001 direction (with alternating sheets of positive and negative charge), acts as an electrostatic gate on the semiconducting SrTiO3. When the LaAlO3 layer grows thicker than three unit cells, its valence band energy rises above the Fermi level, causing holes (or positively charged oxygen vacancies ) to form on the outer surface of the LaAlO3. The positive charge on the surface of the LaAlO3 attracts negative charge to nearby available states. In the case of the LaAlO3/SrTiO3 interface, this means electrons accumulate in the surface of the SrTiO3, in the Ti d bands.

The strengths of the polar gating hypothesis are that it explains why conductivity requires a critical thickness of four unit cells of LaAlO3 and that it explains why conductivity requires the SrTiO3 to be TiO2-terminated. The polar gating hypothesis also explains why alloying the LaAlO3 increases the critical thickness for conductivity.

One weakness of the hypothesis is that it predicts that the LaAlO3 films should exhibit a built-in electric field; so far, x-ray photoemission experiments and other experiments have shown little to no built-in field in the LaAlO3 films. The polar gating hypothesis also cannot explain why Ti3+ is detected when the LaAlO3 films are thinner than the critical thickness for conductivity.

The polar gating hypothesis is sometimes called the polar catastrophe hypothesis,  alluding to the counterfactual scenario where electrons don't accumulate at the interface and instead voltage in the LaAlO3 builds up forever. The hypothesis has also been called the electronic reconstruction hypothesis, highlighting the fact that electrons, not ions, move to compensate the building voltage.

Oxygen vacancies 

Another hypothesis is that the conductivity comes from free electrons left by oxygen vacancies in the SrTiO3.  SrTiO3 is known to be easily doped by oxygen vacancies, so this was initially considered a promising hypothesis. However, electron energy loss spectroscopy measurements have bounded the density of oxygen vacancies well below the density necessary to supply the measured free electron densities.
Another proposed possibility is that oxygen vacancies in the surface of the LaAlO3 are remotely doping the SrTiO3. Under generic growth conditions, multiple mechanisms can coexist. An obvious difference between oxygen vacancies and polar gating in creating the interface conductivity is that the carriers from oxygen vacancies are thermally activated as the donor level of oxygen vacancies is usually separated from the SrTiO3 conduction band, consequently exhibiting the carrier freeze-out effect at low temperatures; in contrast, the carriers originating from the polar gating are transferred into the SrTiO3 conduction band (Ti 3d orbitals) and are therefore degenerate.

Intermixing 

Lanthanum is a known dopant in SrTiO3,  so it has been suggested that La from the LaAlO3 mixes into the SrTiO3 and dopes it n-type. Multiple studies have shown that intermixing takes place at the interface;  however, it is not clear whether there is enough intermixing to provide all of the free carriers. For example, a flipped interface between a SrTiO3 film and a LaAlO3 substrate is insulating.

Structural distortions 

A fourth hypothesis is that the LaAlO3 crystal structure undergoes octahedral rotations in response to the strain from the SrTiO3. These octahedral rotations in the LaAlO3 induce octahedral rotations in the SrTiO3, increasing the Ti d-band width enough so that electrons are no longer localized.

Superconductivity 

Superconductivity was first observed in LaAlO3/SrTiO3 interfaces in 2007, with a critical temperature of ~200 mK. Like the conductivity, the superconductivity appears to be two-dimensional.

Ferromagnetism 

Hints of ferromagnetism in LaAlO3/SrTiO3 were first seen in 2007, when Dutch researchers observed hysteresis in the magnetoresistance of LaAlO3/SrTiO3. Follow up measurements with torque magnetometry indicated that the magnetism in LaAlO3/SrTiO3 persisted all the way to room temperature. In 2011, researchers at Stanford University used a scanning SQUID to directly image the ferromagnetism, and found that it occurred in heterogeneous patches. Like the conductivity in LaAlO3/SrTiO3, the magnetism only appeared when the LaAlO3 films were thicker than a few unit cells. However, unlike conductivity, magnetism was seen at SrO-terminated surfaces as well as TiO2-terminated surfaces.

The discovery of ferromagnetism in a materials system that also superconducts spurred a flurry of research and debate, because ferromagnetism and superconductivity almost never coexist together. Ferromagnetism requires electron spins to align, while superconductivity typically requires electron spins to anti-align.

Magnetoresistance 

Magnetoresistance measurements are a major experimental tool used to understand the electronic properties of materials. The magnetoresistance of LaAlO3/SrTiO3 interfaces has been used to reveal the 2D nature of conduction, carrier concentrations (through the hall effect), electron mobilities, and more.

Field applied out-of-plane 

At low magnetic field, the magnetoresistance of LaAlO3/SrTiO3 is parabolic versus field, as expected for an ordinary metal. However, at higher fields, the magnetoresistance appears to become linear versus field. Linear magnetoresistance can have many causes, but so far there is no scientific consensus on the cause of linear magnetoresistance in LaAlO3/SrTiO3 interfaces.  Linear magnetoresistance has also been measured in pure SrTiO3 crystals, so it may be unrelated to the emergent properties of the interface.

Field applied in-plane 

At low temperature (T < 30 K), the LaAlO3/SrTiO3 interface exhibits negative in-plane magnetoresistance, sometimes as large as -90%. The large negative in-plane magnetoresistance has been ascribed to the interface's enhanced spin-orbit interaction.

Electron gas distribution at the LaAlO3/SrTiO3 interface
Experimentally, the charge density profile of the electron gas at the LaAlO3/SrTiO3 interface has a strongly asymmetric shape with a rapid initial decay over the first 2 nm and a pronounced tail that extends to about 11 nm. A wide variety of theoretical calculations support this result. Importantly, to get electron distribution one have to take into account field-dependent dielectric constant of SrTiO3.

Comparison to other 2D electron gases 

The 2D electron gas that arises at the LaAlO3/SrTiO3 interface is notable for two main reasons. First, it has very high carrier concentration, on the order of 1013 cm−2. Second, if the polar gating hypothesis is true, the 2D electron gas has the potential to be totally free of disorder, unlike other 2D electron gases that require doping or gating to form. However, so far researchers have been unable to synthesize interfaces that realize the promise of low disorder.

Synthesis methods 

Most LaAlO3/SrTiO3 interfaces are synthesized using pulsed laser deposition. A high-power laser ablates a LaAlO3 target, and the plume of ejected material is deposited onto a heated SrTiO3 substrate. Typical conditions used are:

Laser wavelength of 248 nm
Laser fluence of 0.5 J/cm2 to 2 J/cm2
Substrate temperature of 600 °C to 850 °C
Background oxygen pressure of 10−5 Torr to 10−3 Torr

Some LaAlO3/SrTiO3 interfaces have also been synthesized by molecular beam epitaxy, sputtering, and atomic layer deposition.

Similar interfaces 

To better understand in the LaAlO3/SrTiO3 interface, researchers have synthesized a number of analogous interfaces between other polar perovskite films and SrTiO3. Some of these analogues have properties similar to LaAlO3/SrTiO3, but some do not.

Conductive interfaces 

GdTiO3/SrTiO3
LaTiO3/SrTiO3
LaVO3/SrTiO3
LaGaO3/SrTiO3
PrAlO3/SrTiO3
NdAlO3/SrTiO3
NdGaO3/SrTiO3
GdAlO3/SrTiO3
Nd0.35Sr0.65MnO3/SrTiO3
Al2O3/SrTiO3
amorphous-YAlO3/SrTiO3 
La0.5Al0.5Sr0.5Ti0.5O3/SrTiO3
DyScO3/SrTiO3
KTaO3/SrTiO3
CaZrO3/SrTiO3

Insulating interfaces 

LaCrO3/SrTiO3
LaMnO3/SrTiO3
La2O3/SrTiO3
Y2O3/SrTiO3
LaYO3/SrTiO3
EuAlO3/SrTiO3
BiMnO3/SrTiO3

Applications 

As of 2015, there are no commercial applications of the LaAlO3/SrTiO3 interface. However, speculative applications have been suggested, including field-effect devices, sensors, photodetectors, and thermoelectrics;
related LaVO3/SrTiO3 is a functional solar cell albeit hitherto with a low efficiency.

References

External links 
 Materials science: Enter the oxides

Condensed matter physics
Materials science
Perovskites